Schwemmer may refer to:

Hans Schwemmer (1945–2001), Vatican diplomat and archbishop 
Heinrich Schwemmer (1621–1696), music teacher and composer